Gnathodontidae is an extinct conodont family in the order Ozarkodinida. It consists of the extinct genus Icriodus.

References 

 Carboniferous gnathodontid conodont apparatuses: evidence of a dual origin for Pennsylvanian taxa. RC Grayson, GK Merrill, 1990, Senckenbergische Naturforschende Gesellschaft

External links 

Ozarkodinida families